Green Cove is a settlement in Newfoundland and Labrador. It is located on New World Island.

Populated places in Newfoundland and Labrador